Jumbo Cove is a cove  southeast of Busen Point on the north coast of South Georgia. It was charted and named by Discovery Investigations personnel during the period 1926–30.

References

Coves of South Georgia